Hans Donauer (c1521, Munich – 1596, Munich), was a German Renaissance painter. He is sometimes known as Hans Donauer the Elder. His surname is sometimes spelt "Thonauer or Thunauer.

Biography
According to Karel van Mander he was the teacher of Hans Rottenhammer.

According to the RKD he was also the teacher of the painter Kaspar Amort.

References

Weblink 

1521 births
1596 deaths
German Renaissance painters
Artists from Munich